Asian Para Table Tennis Championships are a biennial sports event for para table tennis players who represent an Asian country. It debuted in 2005 as Asia and Oceania Championships but separated in 2013.

Locations
The competitor numbers are of Asian countries and their table tennis players between the years 2005 and 2011.

All-time medal count
As of 2019.

See also
Oceania Para Table Tennis Championships
Asian Table Tennis Championships

References

Table tennis competitions
Para table tennis
Recurring sporting events established in 2005